The United Mine Workers coal strike of 1919 saw coal miners strike for over a month, from November 1 to December 10, 1919, for better wages.

Background
1919 in the United States saw the country undergoing the First Red Scare a period marked by a widespread fear of Bolshevism and anarchism, due to real and imagined events; real events included the Russian Revolution and anarchist bombings.  At its height in 1919–1920, concerns over the effects of radical political agitation in American society and the alleged spread of communism and anarchism in the American labor movement fueled a general sense of concern. Add to this was the ongoing steel strike of 1919, an attempt by the weakened Amalgamated Association of Iron, Steel and Tin Workers (AA) to organize the United States steel industry in the wake of World War I. The strike had begun on September 22, 1919.

Coal strike of 1919
The United Mine Workers under John L. Lewis announced a strike for November 1, 1919. They had agreed to a wage agreement to run until the end of World War I and now sought to capture some of their industry's wartime gains. Attorney General A. Mitchell Palmer invoked the Lever Act, a wartime measure that made it a crime to interfere with the production or transportation of necessities. The law, meant to punish hoarding and profiteering, had never been used against a union. Certain of united political backing and almost universal public support, Palmer obtained an injunction on October 31 and 400,000 coal workers struck the next day. He claimed the President authorized the action, following a meeting with the severely ill President in the presence of his doctor.  Palmer also asserted that the entire Cabinet had backed his request for an injunction. That infuriated Secretary of Labor Wilson who had opposed Palmer's plan and supported Gompers' view of the President's promises when the Act was under consideration. The rift between the Attorney General and the Secretary of Labor was never healed, which had consequences the next year when Palmer's attempts to deport radicals were frustrated by the Department of Labor. 

On November 2, 1919, the Great Falls Daily Tribune published that around 394,000 bituminous miners out of a total of 615,000 employed by the coal industry were on strike. The miners on strike were based in the following states:

Samuel Gompers, President of the American Federation of Labor, protested that President Wilson and members of his Cabinet had provided assurances when the Act was passed that it would not be used to prevent strikes by labor unions. He provided detailed accounts of his negotiations with representatives of the administration, especially Secretary of Labor William B. Wilson. He also argued that the end of hostilities, even in the absence of a signed treaty, should have invalidated any attempts to enforce the Act's provisions. Nevertheless, he attempted to mediate between Palmer and Lewis, but after several days called the injunction "so autocratic as to stagger the human mind". The coal operators smeared the strikers with charges that Lenin and Trotsky had ordered the strike and were financing it, and some of the press echoed that language. Others used words like "insurrection" and "Bolshevik revolution". Eventually Lewis, facing criminal charges and sensitive to the propaganda campaign, withdrew his strike call, though many strikers ignored his action. As the strike dragged on into its third week, coal supplies were running low and public sentiment was calling for ever stronger government action. The final agreement came on December 10.   The deal amounted to a 14% wage increase as well as an appointment of an investigatory commission to continue the exploration of the wage issue. The agreement was signed by John L. Lewis, John Brophy and other officials, and called on the miners to return to work.

See also

List of miners' strikes
Steel strike of 1919
UMW Anthracite General Strike of 1922

Bibliography 
Notes

References 
 - Total pages: 467 
 - Total pages: 351
 - Total pages: 738 

 - Total pages: 352 

1919 labor disputes and strikes
1919 in the United States
Miners' labor disputes in the United States
Mining in the United States
Protests in the United States
Labor disputes led by the United Mine Workers of America
November 1919 events
December 1919 events